Nasera Sharma (born 1948) is an Indian writer who writes in Hindi.

Biography 
She was born in Allahabad, Uttar Pradesh, India.

She has published 10 Hindi-language novels. Some of the books are- Parijat, Mere Priya Kahaniyaan, Ajnabi Jajira, Patthar Gali and Aurat Ke Liye Aurat.

She was the only woman from South Asia to interview Ruhollah Khomeini after he came into power.

Awards 
She won a Sahitya Akademi Award for her novel Paarijat.

She won Vyas Samman for her novel Kagaz ki naav in 2019.

References

External links

1948 births
Living people
Hindi novelists
Indian women novelists
Recipients of the Sahitya Akademi Award in Hindi
20th-century Indian women writers
20th-century Indian novelists